Namsaknoi Yudthagarngamtorn (Thai: นำศักดิ์น้อย ยุทธการกำธร, born October 13, 1979) is a retired Muay Thai fighter from Thailand. He holds one of the highest winning percentages (95% wins in 300 fights), and one of the longest reigns as a Lumpinee Stadium Champion in history, remaining undefeated for the 135 lbs title between 2000–2006. He held wins over Muay Thai legends such as Saenchai, Samkor Kiatmontep, Kaolan Kaovichit, and Neungpichit Sityodtong. Namsaknoi was the camp senior of international Muay Thai superstar Buakaw when they both trained at Por Pramuk Camp. He spent 6 years in Singapore where he was an instructor to the Evolve Fight Team at Evolve Mixed Martial Arts, coaching world renowned MMA fighters such as Rafael Dos Anjos, Tarec Saffiedine, and Shinya Aoki.

Biography

Early life 
Namsaknoi was born Muhammud Chaiyamart in a small fishing village in the Southern Thailand province of Surat Thani. He was the youngest of 7 siblings, of whom an elder brother (Ges Chaiyamart) was also a Muay Thai fighter. Namsaknoi’s parents struggled to feed the family on a fisherman's meager income, which was one of the key motivations that drove the young Namsaknoi to Muay Thai when he was 8 years old to help support the family.

Namsaknoi adopted his fight name from his uncle, the original Namsak, who was a well-known fighter in the South. Proving to be a natural in the sport, he was fairly successful in his early fights in the Southern provinces. When he was 12, his trainer brought him to Bangkok where he would have access to higher quality training and fight opportunities.

Fighting in Bangkok 
Namsaknoi spent his formative years in Kiatsingnoi Gym in Bangkok, alongside other golden-era champions such as Pairot, Wangchannoi, and Rattanachai. He climbed his way up steadily in the competitive fight scene of the country's capital, often matched against older and more experienced fighters and winning most of them.

When he was 17 years old, he was voted and won the highly prestigious Sportswriters Association of Thailand Fighter of the Year Award of 1996. He was one of the youngest fighters to win the accolade at that time. He won another, different Fighter of the Year Award 3 years later, given by the Sports Authority of Thailand. Later, he was acquired by Por Pramuk Camp in the outskirts of Bangkok, where he would remain until his retirement.

At Por Pramuk, his campmates include Chok Dee, Ponsawan, Kompayak, Nonthanon, and Buakaw, the golden boys that propelled the fame of Por Pramuk Camp internationally. Throughout his fight career, he fought some of the best Thai fighters of the golden era, including Neungpichit Sidyodtong, Saenchai PKSaenchaimuaythaigym, Samkor Kiatmontep, Attachai Fairtex, Kaolan Kaovichit, and Lamnammoon Sor Sumalee.

While his camp junior Buakaw would gain international fame from his participation in K1 Kickboxing, Namsaknoi mostly fought within Thailand, against the crème de la crème of the sport. He only fought a handful of fights outside of Thailand, in Japan (where he won a 2nd round TKO against the dangerous Satoshi Kobayashi), Korea, Macau, and Italy. Namsaknoi held the 135 lbs Lumpinee Stadium Belt for an astounding 6 years, until his retirement in 2006, ending his career with an impressive record of 280 wins, 15 losses, and 5 draws. For his long reign as the unbeatable champion, the Thai media gave him the nickname of “The Emperor”.

Namsaknoi is known for his graceful and elaborate Wai Kru Ram Muay, winning the award for the best Wai Kru Ram Muay of the year twice, in 2001 and 2006.

Dispute with Por Pramuk 
Namsaknoi left Por Pramuk camp after a bitter dispute over the mismanagement of his fight winnings. The fallout that shocked the Muay Thai community forced Namsaknoi into retirement, as no gym was able to pay Por Pramuk's asking price to buy over Namsaknoi's contract. Destitute with no money nor belts to his name (he left most of his physical possessions in the camp when he walked out), Namsaknoi returned to his hometown of Chaiya in Surat Thani province, never to step into the rings of Bangkok again.

Transition to coaching 
After retirement, Namsaknoi worked as a trainer in the tourist-heavy islands of Southern Thailand, spending a couple of years in Koh Phangan, Koh Samui, and Phuket. In 2010, he was approached by Chatri Sityodtong to join Evolve Mixed Martial Arts in Singapore, where he worked as a Muay Thai instructor for 6 years.

In early 2016, Namsaknoi left Evolve MMA as their Head Muay Thai Instructor, and returned to Koh Phangan, Thailand to set up his own Muay Thai gym, named Namsaknoi Muay Thai Club. The gym was opened on 14 October 2016. However in December 2017, Namsaknoi left his gym in Koh Phangan, despite growing interest and success of the gym.

In 2019 he was for one year a Co Trainer in Germany, at the Fight Club in Ludwigsburg.

Titles and accomplishments

Muay Thai
Lumpinee Stadium
 1995 Lumpinee Stadium Fly Weight Champion 112 lbs
 1999 Lumpinee Stadium Super Feather Weight Champion 130 lbs
 2000–2006 Lumpinee Stadium Light Weight Champion 135 lbs 

World Muay Thai Council
 1995 WMC World Champion 112 lbs

World Association of Kickboxing Organizations
 2010 WAKO Pro World Muay Thai Champion 154 lbs

 Ford Ranger Tournament 126 lbs Champion
 Champion of South of Thailand 126 lbs
 Champion of South of Thailand 95 lbs

Awards
 1996 Sports Writers Association of Thailand Fighter of the Year
 1999 Sports Authority of Thailand Fighter of the Year
 2001 Sports Writers Association of Thailand Fight of the Year (vs Kaolan Kaovichit)
 2002 Sports Writers Association of Thailand Fight of the Year (vs Pajonsuk Lukprabat)

 Best Ram Muay of the Year 2001
 Best Ram Muay of the Year 2006

Boxing
Pan Asian Boxing Association
 2002 interim PABA Boxing Champion 135 lbs

Fight record

|-
|-  bgcolor="#CCFFCC"
| 2010-12-04 || Win ||align=left| Diego Calzolari || Janus Fight Night 2010 || Padua, Italy || KO(Knee) || 4 || 1:25
|-
! style=background:white colspan=9 |
|-
|-  bgcolor="#FFBBBB"
| 2009-05-09 || Loss ||align=left| Berneung Topkingboxing || Royal Cup Of Kedah || Malaysia || Decision || 5 || 3:00 
|-
|-  bgcolor="#FFBBBB"
| 2008-07-25 || Loss ||align=left| Berneung Topkingboxing || Bangla Stadium || Patong, Thailand || Decision || 5 || 3:00 
|-
|-  bgcolor="#CCFFCC"
| 2005-10-21 || Win ||align=left| Nontachai Sit-O || Lumpinee Champian Krikkri Fights,  Lumpinee Stadium || Bangkok, Thailand || Decision (Unanimous) || 5 || 3:00
|-
! style=background:white colspan=9 |  
|-  bgcolor="#CCFFCC"
| 2005-07-05 || Win ||align=left| Samranchai 96Peenung || Paianun Fights,  Lumpinee Stadium || Bangkok, Thailand || Decision (Unanimous) || 5 || 3:00
|-
! style=background:white colspan=9 |  
|-  bgcolor="#CCFFCC"
| 2005-06-04 || Win ||align=left| Jung Woong Moon || KOMA Gran Prix || Seoul, Korea || Extension round Decision || 4 || 3:00
|-
|-  bgcolor="#FFBBBB"
| 2005-05-17 || Loss ||align=left| Munkong Kiatsomkuan || P.Pramuk Fights,  Lumpinee Stadium || Bangkok, Thailand || Decision  || 5 || 3:00
|-
|-  bgcolor="#FFBBBB"
| 2005-04-21 || Loss ||align=left| Munkong Kiatsomkuan || Wansongchai Fights,  Rajadamnern Stadium || Bangkok, Thailand || Decision  || 5 || 3:00
|-
|-  bgcolor="#CCFFCC"
| 2004-11-09 || Win ||align=left| Munkong Kiatsomkuan || P.Pramuk Fights,  Lumpinee Stadium || Bangkok, Thailand || Decision (Unanimous) || 5 || 3:00
|- |-  bgcolor="#CCFFCC"
| 2004-10-13 || Win ||align=left| Chi Bin Lim || XENIA X-Fighter || Seoul, Korea || KO || 4 ||  
|-
|-  bgcolor="#CCFFCC"
| 2004-09-03 || Win ||align=left| Nontachai Sit-O || P.Pramuk Fights, Lumpinee Stadium || Bangkok, Thailand || Decision (Unanimous) || 5 || 3:00
|-
! style=background:white colspan=9 |   
|-  bgcolor="#FFBBBB"
| 2004-07-02 || Loss ||align=left| Naruepol Fairtex || Paianun Fights, Lumpinee Stadium || Bangkok, Thailand || Decision || 5 || 3:00
|-
|-  bgcolor="#CCFFCC"
| 2003-11-18 || Win ||align=left| Noppadeat Sengsimaiugym || Por.Pramuk,  Lumpinee Stadium || Bangkok, Thailand || Decision  || 5 || 3:00
|-
! style=background:white colspan=9 |  
|- 
|-  bgcolor="#CCFFCC"
| 2003 || Win ||align=left| Pajonsuk Lukprabat || || Bangkok, Thailand || Decision  || 5 || 3:00
|-
|-  bgcolor="#CCFFCC"
|  || Win ||align=left| Samkor Kiatmontep || Lumpinee Stadium || Bangkok, Thailand || Decision  || 5 || 3:00
|-
|-  bgcolor="#FFBBBB"
|  || Loss ||align=left| Samkor Kiatmontep || Lumpinee Stadium || Bangkok, Thailand ||  ||  || 
|-
|-  bgcolor="#c5d2ea"
|  || NC ||align=left| Samkor Kiatmontep || Lumpinee Stadium || Bangkok, Thailand ||  ||  ||
|-
|-  bgcolor="#FFBBBB"
|  || Loss ||align=left| Samkor Kiatmontep || Lumpinee Stadium || Bangkok, Thailand || Decision  || 5 || 3:00
|-
|-  bgcolor="#CCFFCC"
|  || Win ||align=left| Rambojeaw Por Tuptim || Lumpinee Stadium || Bangkok, Thailand || Decision  || 5 || 3:00
|-
|-  bgcolor="#CCFFCC"
| 2002-04-26 || Win ||align=left| Samkor Kiatmontep || Lumpinee Stadium || Bangkok, Thailand || Decision  || 5 || 3:00
|-
! style=background:white colspan=9 | 

|-  bgcolor="#CCFFCC"
| 2002-03-17 || Win ||align=left| Satoshi Kobayashi || A.J.K.F. "OVER the EDGE" || Tokyo, Japan || TKO (Referee Stoppage) || 2 || 2:19
|-  bgcolor="#CCFFCC"
| 2002-02-01 || Win ||align=left| Pajonsuk Lukprabat || || Pattaya, Thailand || Decision  || 5 || 3:00
|-  bgcolor="#CCFFCC"
| 2001-12-04 || Win ||align=left| Kaolan Kaovichit || Lumpinee Stadium || Bangkok, Thailand || Decision  || 5 || 3:00
|-  bgcolor="#CCFFCC"
| 2001-10-26 || Win ||align=left| Manja Kiatnaphachai || Lumpinee Stadium || Bangkok, Thailand || Decision  || 5 || 3:00
|-  bgcolor="#CCFFCC"
| 2000-12-19 || Win ||align=left| Samkor Chor.Rathchatasupak || Lumpinee Stadium || Bangkok, Thailand || Decision|| 5 ||3:00 
|-
|-  style="background:#cfc;"
| 2000-12-02 || Win ||align=left| Saenchai Sor.Kingstar || Lumpinee Stadium || Bangkok, Thailand || Decision || 5 || 3:00
|-  bgcolor="#CCFFCC"
| 2000-11-04 || Win ||align=left| Khunsuek Sit Porramate || Lumpinee Stadium || Bangkok, Thailand || Decision  || 5 || 3:00

|- style="background:#fbb;"
| 2000- || Loss||align=left|  Samkor Chor.Rathchatasupak ||Lumpinee Stadium || Bangkok, Thailand || TKO || 4 || 
|-
|-  bgcolor="#CCFFCC"
| 2000-04-25 || Win ||align=left| Kaolan Kaovichit || Lumpinee Stadium || Bangkok, Thailand || Decision (Unanimous) || 5 || 3:00
|-
! style=background:white colspan=9 |
|-  bgcolor="#CCFFCC"
| 2000-02-29 || Win ||align=left| Khunsuk Phetsuphapan || Lumpinee Stadium || Bangkok, Thailand || Decision  || 5 || 3:00
|-  bgcolor="#c5d2ea"
| 2000-02-05 || Draw ||align=left| Attachai Por.Samranchai || Lumpinee Stadium || Bangkok, Thailand || Decision  || 5 || 3:00

|-  bgcolor="#CCFFCC"
| 1999-12-07 || Win ||align=left| Lamnamoon Sor.Sumalee || Lumpinee Stadium || Bangkok, Thailand || KO (Elbow) || 3 ||
|-
! style=background:white colspan=9 |
|-  bgcolor="#CCFFCC"
| 1999-09-25 || Win ||align=left| Kochasan Singklongsee || Lumpinee Stadium || Bangkok, Thailand || Decision || 5 || 3:00
|-  bgcolor="#CCFFCC"
| 1999-07-03 || Win ||align=left| Thongthai Sitchomphob || Lumpinee Stadium || Bangkok, Thailand || Decision || 5 || 3:00
|-  bgcolor="#CCFFCC"
| 1999-05-15 || Win ||align=left| Baiphet Loogjaomaesaiwaree || Lumpinee Stadium || Bangkok, Thailand || KO (high kick) || 4 ||
|-  bgcolor="#CCFFCC"
| 1999 || Win ||align=left| Kochasan Singklongsee || Lumpinee Stadium || Bangkok, Thailand || Decision || 5 || 3:00
|-  bgcolor="#CCFFCC"
| 1997-07-26 || Win ||align=left| Chaichana Dejtawee || Lumpinee Stadium || Bangkok, Thailand || Decision  || 5 || 3:00
|-
|-  bgcolor="#fbb"
| 1997-05-09 || Loss ||align=left| Sot Looknongyangtoy || Lumpinee Stadium || Bangkok, Thailand || TKO (Doctor Stoppage) || 2 || 
|-
|-  bgcolor="#CCFFCC"
| 1997 || Win ||align=left| Thongchai Tor. Silachai || Lumpinee Stadium || Bangkok, Thailand || Decision  || 5 || 3:00
|-
|-  bgcolor="#CCFFCC"
|  || Win ||align=left| Saenchai Sor Kingstar || Lumpinee Stadium || Bangkok, Thailand || Decision  || 5 || 3:00
|-  bgcolor="#CCFFCC"
| 1996-11-26 || Win ||align=left| Telek Por Samranchai || Lumpinee Stadium || Bangkok, Thailand || Decision  || 5 || 3:00
|-
|-  bgcolor="#c5d2ea"
| 1996-07-09 || Draw ||align=left| Thodatailek Sarina || Lumpinee Stadium || Bangkok, Thailand || Decision  || 5 || 3:00
|-  bgcolor="#c5d2ea"
| 1996-03-16 || Draw||align=left| Kaewfanoi Sor.Rachada || Lumpinee Stadium || Bangkok, Thailand || Decision  || 5 || 3:00
|-  bgcolor="#CCFFCC"
| 1995 || Win ||align=left| Nungpichit Sityodthong || Lumpinee Stadium || Bangkok, Thailand || Decision  || 5 || 3:00
|-
! style=background:white colspan=9 |

|-  bgcolor="#CCFFCC"
| 1994-1995 || Win ||align=left| Nongpreeya || Lumpinee Stadium || Bangkok, Thailand || Decision  || 5 || 3:00
|-  bgcolor="#CCFFCC"
| 1994-1995 || Win ||align=left| Yodthongchai Sit Ma Aok || Lumpinee Stadium || Bangkok, Thailand || KO || 4 || 
|-  bgcolor="#CCFFCC"
| 1994-1995 || Win ||align=left| Erawan Sitdenchai || Lumpinee Stadium || Bangkok, Thailand || Decision  || 5 || 3:00
|-  bgcolor="#CCFFCC"
| 1994-1995 || Win ||align=left| Phayaklek Sitjamee || Lumpinee Stadium || Bangkok, Thailand || Decision  || 5 || 3:00
|-  bgcolor="#CCFFCC"
| 1994-1995 || Win ||align=left| Pinphet Por.Weor || Lumpinee Stadium || Bangkok, Thailand || Decision  || 5 || 3:00
|-
|-
| colspan=9 | Legend:

References

External links 
 The Rise and Fall of a Muay Thai Legend
 Namsaknoi vs Satoshi Kobayashi: Lawrence Kenshin Striking Breakdown
 Namsaknoi's Wai Kru Ram Muay
Namsaknoi's Muay Thai Tutorial Videos 

1979 births
Living people
Lightweight kickboxers
Namsaknoi Yudthagarngamtorn
Namsaknoi Yudthagarngamtorn
Namsaknoi Yudthagarngamtorn